Matteus Oliveira Santos (born 11 October 1989), simply known as Matteus, is a Brazilian footballer who plays for Atlético Paranaense as a defensive midfielder.

Club career
Born in Ubaitaba, Bahia, Matteus played amateur football well into his 20s. He was also on trial at FC Zürich in 2011, but nothing came of it, and he made his debuts as a senior with Portuguesa Santista in the following year.

In late 2012 Matteus joined Independente de Limeira, appearing regularly and being one of the club's most important players. On 28 May 2013 he moved to Atlético Paranaense, but was loaned to Ferroviária in August.

Matteus returned to Furacão in September 2014, and made his debut for the club on 7 December, coming on as a second-half substitute for Nathan in a 1–1 away draw against Palmeiras.

References

External links
Atlético Pararanaense profile 

1989 births
Living people
Sportspeople from Bahia
Brazilian footballers
Association football midfielders
Campeonato Brasileiro Série A players
Associação Atlética Portuguesa (Santos) players
Club Athletico Paranaense players
Associação Ferroviária de Esportes players
Guaratinguetá Futebol players
Associação Portuguesa de Desportos players